Dialog Axiata PLC (formerly known as MTN Networks and later Dialog Telekom), is one of Sri Lanka's largest telecommunications service providers, and the country's largest mobile network operator with 17.4 million  subscribers which amounts to 57% of the Sri Lankan mobile market. Dialog is a subsidiary of Axiata Group Berhad which owns 83.32% controlling stake of the company, while the rest is held by the public.

Dialog was Listed on the Colombo Stock Exchange in 2005 June As of February 2017 Dialog Axiata holds  billion in market capitalization and the 5th largest listed company in Sri Lanka by Market Capitalization. In 2015 "Dialog" brand name was valued at LKR 28.6 billion (US$204 million) and as the 3rd most valuable brand in the country by business magazine LMD in its annual study. In 2014 the company received the highest "Platinum" rating in the country's Corporate Accountability Index for the 4th consecutive year.

Dialog operates on 2.5G, 3G, 3.5G, 4G LTE, 5G communications networks, and became the first operator to launch commercial 3G and HSPA+ operations in South Asia when it rollout the network on 16 August 2006. In April 2013 Dialog Axiata launched its mobile 4G LTE services using 10Mhz of spectrum in 1800Mhz band becoming the first operator to launch commercial FD-LTE network in South Asia, initially delivering peak data rates of 100 Mbit/s. Dialog Axiata was also the first to introduce the 5G network in Sri Lanka.

In addition to its core business of mobile telephony, the company operates a number of services including Dialog TV, a Direct To Home Satellite TV service, and Dialog Global which provides international telecommunication services. Dialog Broadband offers fixed-line and broadband internet services, whilst Dialog Tele-Infrastructure is the company’s national telco infrastructure arm.

Dialog was the first mobile operator to cover the Jaffna peninsula in Northern Sri Lanka within 90 days of the ceasefire agreement in 2002 and again in 2009 was the first mobile operator to extend its GSM network to the areas in the North and East Province where the war was fought, and presently has 80% market share in the region.

Dialog Axiata is an investor under the aegis of the Board of Investment of Sri Lanka and has invested over US $1.96 billion towards the development of telecommunications infrastructure, thus becoming the single largest contributor to Sri Lankan foreign direct investment (FDI) to date.

History

MTN Networks (Pvt) Ltd (1993–2005) 
Dialog was incorporated in 1993 as MTN Networks (Private) Limited with 90% of equity through Telekom Malaysia Berhad (TM) and 10% by Capital Maharaja being the local promoters to the investment. Telekom Malaysia (TM) is the Majority owned by the Government of Malaysia, and is the incumbent and dominant fixed-line telecom operator in Malaysia. At the time of setup, MTN was the 4th entry to the Sri Lankan Mobile market which already had 3 established operators.

In 1995 just after 2 years of incorporation, MTN Networks began its commercial operations under the brand name Dialog GSM by rolling out the first digital network in South Asia using GSM technology hence offering a superior service compared to analog networks at the time.

In 1996, the local promoters divested their stake providing complete ownership of MTN Networks to Telekom Malaysia. In mid-1997 Hans Wijayasuriya was appointed as the CEO of MTN Networks, at the age of 29 becoming the youngest CEO in a multimillion-dollar investment.

Marking another regional first Dialog GSM was the first operator in Asia Pacific to deliver international roaming in 1997.
MTN Networks was able to record its first operational profit for the financial year of 1998 when Dialog GSM had a subscriber base close to 75,000. Beginning of the new millennium brought fortunes for Dialog as in the year 2000 it was able to attain the market leader position in the mobile market surpassing the incumbent operators.

The year 2001 saw the launch of Dialog Internet, thus starting ISP operations by launching GPRS and MMS services based on existing 2G infrastructure and becoming the first GPRS and MMS operator in South Asia.

In 2004 surpassing a milestone Dialog GSM was able to attain 1 million subscriber base and to commission its 500th 2G base station.

Dialog Telekom PLC (2005–2010) 
In March 2005 MTN Networks Pvt Ltd unveiled its new corporate identity as Dialog Telekom Ltd at a shindig witnessed by Mahathir Mohamad, Former Prime Minister of Malaysia, celebrating the Company's ten years of telecommunications infrastructure development in Sri Lanka.

In 2005, Dialog Telekom launched the largest IPO seen by the Sri Lankan capital markets in an attempt to finance expanding the network. The Dialog Telekom initial offer, which was launched on a book building structure at a price range of LKR 8 to LKR 12 per share, consists of 712.3 million ordinary shares, which is a 9.6% stake of the company. Offer was oversubscribed 3 times within an hour of opening and Dialog Telekom was able to raise LKR 8.55 Billion (US$77 million) in fresh capital making this the largest IPO to date in the country.
Dialog Telekom made history on the first trading day when trading commenced at a price of LKR 14.25 making Dialog Telekom the first Sri Lankan Company to reach the US$1 billion market capitalization mark.

In 2005 December, Dialog Telekom Acquired 100% stake of MTT Network Pvt Ltd for LKR 1.86 Billion (US$19.2 million). At the time of Acquisition MTT was the leading digital transmission and backbone provider for other Cellular operators and television stations. Other than that MTT also operated CDMA telephony services and external gateway operations. Pursuant to the Acquisition MTT was renamed Dialog Broadband Networks Pvt Ltd (DBN) which as a fully owned subsidiary of Dialog Telekom and continued providing service to MTT clientele and also expanded on CDMA operations.

In 2006 December, Dialog Telekom completed the takeover of troubled DTH satellite television provider CBN SAT (Private) Ltd for LKR 523.8 million (US$4.6 million) marking Dialog's entry into the television segment thus positioning itself as a quadruple play service provider. CBNsat was re-branded as DialogTV and operates as a fully owned subsidiary of Dialog Telekom.

Chief Executives 
The following is a chronological list of people who have served as chief executive officer of Dialog Axiata PLC in its history

 Mr. Mohammed Said Mohammed Ali (1993–1996)
 Datuk Zaini Diman (1996–1997)
 Dr. Hans Wijayasuriya (1997–2016)
 Mr. Supun Weerasinghe (2017 – present)

Mobile 
Dialog Mobile has island-wide coverage with over 3,000 2G/3G sites and over 4000 4G Dialog sites. 5G Coverage has already been provided in certain suburbs of the Colombo District & Gampaha District & Galle district.

All towers in the network were 3G enabled to provide data services to consumers in all parts of the island, while all key urban and sub-urban areas were covered with 4G network capabilities.

Television 

Dialog Television is a Direct To Home (DTH) satellite television service operated by Dialog. Dialog Television channels focus on news, entertainment and knowledge based programming. It provides international content including CNN, BBC, HBO, Cinemax, AXN, Star Sports, Discovery Channel, MTV and Cartoon Network, in addition to a portfolio of Sri Lankan television channels. Dialog Satellite TV uses Digital Video Broadcasting through Satellite DVB-S technology. DTV is the only pay TV operator in Sri Lanka to have island-wide coverage and was the first to introduce DVB-T(terrestrial) technology in Sri Lanka. As of September 2021, there are over 1.7 million Dialog Television subscribers.

Fixed Line 

Dialog Broadband Networks (DBN), DBA Dialog, is Sri Lanka's largest fixed phone operator with an island wide digital wireless network. The company uses technologies such as VoLTE, DECT, E-1 R2/PRI, CorDECT etc., to connect thousands of residential customers and businesses. Dialog Axiata PLC acquired Suntel in 2012 under and now it is operated by its subsidiary Dialog Broadband Networks (Pvt) Ltd.

Services
Fixed Phone Services (VoLTE)
Internet (TD-LTE)
Managed Services
Internet Data Center Facilities
Virtual Private Networking (MPLS-VPN's)
Corporate Data Networks

Global 
Dialog Global, the international arm of Dialog Axiata, provides international services with voice roaming coverage of 230 countries on 670 networks, 4G LTE roaming coverage of 88 countries on 210 networks including bilateral partnerships with global carriers. dilog

See also 
 Dialog i43
 Dialog K35
 Dialog K45

References

External links

 
Axiata
Vodafone
Telecommunications companies of Sri Lanka
Companies listed on the Colombo Stock Exchange